Ambridge High School is a midsized, suburban secondary school in Ambridge, Pennsylvania. By 2016, the school enrollment was reported as 749 pupils in grades 9th through 12th.

Extracurriculars
Ambridge Area High School offers a variety of clubs, activities and sports.

Sports
The District funds:

Varsity

Boys
Baseball - AAAA
Basketball- AAAA
Bowling - AAAAAA
Cross Country - AA
Football - AAAA
Golf - AAA
Soccer - AAA
Tennis - AA
Track and Field - AAA
Volleyball - AA
Wrestling - AAA

Girls
Basketball - AAAA
Bowling - AAAAAA
Cross Country - AA
Golf - AA
Soccer (Fall) - AAA
Softball - AAAA
Girls' Tennis - AA
Track and Field - AAA
Volleyball - AAA

According to PIAA directory July 2016

Notable alumni
 Paul Hertneky, writer
 Susan Laughlin, politician
 John Michelosen, football player and coach
 Mike Lucci, NFL football player
 Marita Grabiak, television director
 Dianne K. Prinz, physicist, astronaut

Notable faculty
 Mike Sebastian, football coach

References

Ambridge, Pennsylvania
Public high schools in Pennsylvania
Schools in Beaver County, Pennsylvania